DSO National Laboratories (DSO) is a national defence research and development organisation in Singapore developing technological solutions for defence and national security.

Founded as the Electronics Test Centre (ETC), it was established in 1972 by then-Minister for Defence Goh Keng Swee, to conduct research on future warfare. It was later renamed to the Defence Science Organisation (DSO) in 1977. Upon its incorporation as a not-for-profit company in 1997, it was renamed as DSO National Laboratories.

Today, much of the work done by DSO has gone into Singapore's military, as well as into agencies responsible for homeland security. It has currently more than 1,600 research scientists and engineers.

External links
 DSO Official Web Site

References

Military intelligence agencies
Military of Singapore